Nikolay Ozhegin (born 4 May 1971) is a Russian judoka who was a 1995 World Champion, 1990 Junior World Champion, and multiple-time Russian Champion (1994 and 1999). He also competed at the 1996 Summer Olympics in the men's extra-lightweight (60 kg) event but did not win a medal after being defeated in the second round by the famous Japanese champion Tadahiro Nomura.

Achievements

External links
 

1971 births
Living people
Sportspeople from Kokshetau
Russian male judoka
Judoka at the 1996 Summer Olympics
Olympic judoka of Russia
Goodwill Games medalists in judo
World judo champions
Competitors at the 1994 Goodwill Games
20th-century Russian people